Statistics of Japanese Regional Leagues for the 1980 season.

Champions list

League standings

Hokkaido

Tohoku

Kantō

Hokushinetsu

Tōkai

Kansai

Chūgoku

Shikoku

Kyushu

1980
Jap
Jap
3